Willi Hohm is an Austrian para-alpine skier. He won the bronze medal in the Men's Downhill B1 event at the 1988 Winter Paralympics in Innsbruck, Austria. He also represented Austria at the 1976 Winter Paralympics and at the 1984 Winter Paralympics.

See also 
 List of Paralympic medalists in alpine skiing

References 

Living people
Year of birth missing (living people)
Place of birth missing (living people)
Paralympic alpine skiers of Austria
Alpine skiers at the 1976 Winter Paralympics
Alpine skiers at the 1984 Winter Paralympics
Alpine skiers at the 1988 Winter Paralympics
Medalists at the 1988 Winter Paralympics
Paralympic bronze medalists for Austria
Paralympic medalists in alpine skiing
20th-century Austrian people